Mahmoud Mohammad Kojok (born 1 April 1991) is a Lebanese former footballer who played as a striker.

Starting his career at Ansar in 2008, remained at the club until his retirement in 2021. He also had stints at Racing Beirut and Shabab Sahel on loan. With Ansar, Kojok won multiple titles, namely a Lebanese Premier League title, four Lebanese FA Cups, and two Lebanese Super Cups.

Having already represented Lebanon internationally at youth level, Kojok made his senior debut at the 2012 WAFF Championship. He also participated in the 2014 FIFA World Cup qualifiers.

Club career 
Kojok began his career at Ansar during the 2008–09 Lebanese Premier League. He was sent on a one-year loan to Racing Beirut on 16 September 2015, scoring two goals in 20 games in the 2015–16 season. On 10 August 2018, Kojok joined Shabab Sahel on loan for one year.

Kojok scored two braces in a row in the 2020–21 Lebanese FA Cup for Ansar, against Ahli Nabatieh and Chabab Ghazieh on 29 April and 4 May 2021 respectively. With five goals, Kojok helped Ansar lift the cup as the competition's top goalscorer. On 21 May, Kojok scored a bicycle kick goal against Markaz Balata in the 2021 AFC Cup group stage, to help Ansar win 2–0.

On 27 September 2021, Kojok announced his retirement from football.

International career
Kojok made his debut for Lebanon at the 2012 WAFF Championship, in a 1–0 defeat to Palestine on 11 December 2012. He featured in the 2014 FIFA World Cup qualifiers, in a game against Iran on 11 June 2013. Kojok played eight games for Lebanon internationally.

Personal life 
Kojok holds a master's degree in financial engineering. Following his retirement as a footballer, Kojok moved to Saudi Arabia for work.

Honours 
Ansar
 Lebanese Premier League: 2020–21
 Lebanese FA Cup: 2009–10, 2011–12, 2016–17, 2020–21
 Lebanese Super Cup: 2012, 2021; runner-up: 2017, 2019
 Lebanese Elite Cup runner-up: 2010, 2016, 2019

Individual
 Lebanese FA Cup top goalscorer: 2020–21

References

External links

 
 
 
 
 
 

1991 births
Living people
Association football forwards
Lebanese footballers
People from Chouf District
Lebanese Premier League players
Al Ansar FC players
Racing Club Beirut players
Shabab Al Sahel FC players
Lebanon youth international footballers
Lebanon international footballers